The Chicago Beach Apartments, built in 1929, are located at 5100 South Cornell Avenue in Chicago, USA. Landfilling and other reconfiguration of the lakefront means that the building is not as close to a beach as it once was. Currently known as Scholars Corner Apartments, the building was added to the National Register of Historic Places on May 14, 1986.

Notes

Residential buildings on the National Register of Historic Places in Chicago